Hydroproject (Gidroproekt) is a Russian hydrotechnical design firm. Based in Moscow, it has a number of branches around the country. Its main activities are design of dams, hydroelectric stations, canals, sluices, etc.

Hydroproject and its predecessor institutions have designed most of the hydroelectric dams and irrigation and navigation canals that have been built in the Soviet Union and Russia since the 1930s. They have designed a number of high-profile projects abroad as well, from India to Egypt to Canada. The institute, under Sergey Zhuk's leadership, also researched the Northern river reversal's potential. It has also been involved in realising nuclear power plants in the Soviet Union between 1969 and 1986.

History 
Hydroproject traces its history to the design departments of the Moscow Canal Construction Project (the 1930s), and the Hydroelectrostroy Trust (Трест “Гидроэлектрострой”), which was formed on October 9, 1930, to coordinate the construction of hydroelectric dams in the USSR during its first five-year plan. The first director of the Hydroelectroproject Trust, the successor of the Hydroelectrostroy Trust, between 1932 and 1936, was Vissarion Chichinadze, who was executed during the Great Purge. The two organizations, after changing their names a number of times, were finally merged in 1962. Until 1950, they were within the ambit of the USSR Ministry of Internal Affairs; later, under the Ministry of Energy.

Some of the institute's regional branches, notably the one in Saint Petersburg, known as Lenhydroproject, have an even longer history. In the 1990s, the institute operated as a subsidiary of RAO UES, Russia's national electricity company. In 2010 it became part of the RusHydro group.

Major projects

In the USSR 
Dams:
 Most of the hydro dams on the Volga and Kama; see Zhiguli Hydroelectric Station for a list.
 Angara River dams: Irkutsk Hydroelectric Power Station, Bratsk Hydroelectric Power Station, Ust-Ilimsk Hydroelectric Power Station.
 Yenisei River dams: Krasnoyarsk Dam, Sayano-Shushenskaya Dam
 Inguri Dam, Georgia
 Nurek Dam, Tajikistan
 Rogun Dam, Tajikistan
 Toktogul Dam, Kyrgyzstan
 Pļaviņas Hydroelectric Power Station, Latvia
 Riga Hydroelectric Power Plant, Latvia
 Kruonis PSP, Lithuania

Canals:
 Moscow Canal
 Volga–Don Canal
 Volga–Baltic Waterway

Outside the USSR
Dams:
 Capanda Dam, Angola
 Paraná Medio, Argentina (proposed)
 Jenpeg Dam, the first stage of Nelson River Hydroelectric Project in Manitoba, Canada
 Sanmenxia Dam, China
 Aswan Dam, Egypt
 Melka Wakena Dam, Ethiopia
 Tehri Dam, India
 Al-Bagdadi Dam, Iraq
 Haditha Dam, Iraq
 Dukan Dam, Iraq
 Limón Dam, Peru
 Iron Gate I Hydroelectric Power Station and Iron Gate II Hydroelectric Power Station on the Danube, Romania–Serbia
 Tabqa Dam (a.k.a. Euphrates Dam), Syria
 Tishrin Dam, Syria
 Yali Falls Dam, Vietnam
 Hòa Bình Dam, Vietnam
 Sơn La Dam, Vietnam
 Lai Châu Dam, Vietnam

References

External links
 Official website (in Russian)

Hydroelectricity in Russia
Engineering companies of Russia
Electric power companies of Russia
Russian brands
Companies based in Moscow
Companies of the Soviet Union
RusHydro